Alexander Gamal Radwan (born 30 August 1964) is a German politician.

Education

 1987: Graduated in aeronautical engineering
 1992: First state law examination
 1995: second state law examination

Early career
 Since 1995: Lawyer
 Since 1996: Employed in industry
 Since 1998: Departmental manager of a company in the information and telecommunications sector

Political career

Career in local politics
 1989–1994: District Chairman of the Junge Union in Miesbach
 1994–1999: District Chairman of the Junge Union of Upper Bavaria
 Member of local, district and regional executives of the CSU
 District Chairman of the Upper Bavaria Small Business Union and Vice-Chairman for Bavaria
 Member of the Miesbach District Council

Member of the European Parliament, 1999–2008
Between 1999 and 2008, Radwan was a Member of the European Parliament for Bavaria with the Christian Social Union in Bavaria, Member of the Bureau of the European People's Party and sat on the European Parliament's Committee on Economic and Monetary Affairs.

He was a substitute for the Committee on Legal Affairs and a vice-chair of the Delegation for relations with the Mashreq countries. Between 2004 and 2008, he was the EPP parliamentary group’s spokesperson on economic affairs.

Member of the Bavarian State Parliament, 2008–2013
In the 2008 Bavarian state elections, Radwan was elected to the Landtag of Bavaria. During his term in office, he served on the Committee on Budgetary and Finance Affairs as well as on the Committee on Federal and European Affairs. Within his parliamentary group, he was a member of the working group on defence policy.

In late 2012, Radwan and Ilse Aigner, who was about to leave national politics to run for state office, announced that they would switch electoral districts. As a consequence, Radwan took over Aigner’s district and ran for a seat in the Bundestag.

Member of the German Bundestag, 2013–present
Radwan has been a member of the German Bundestag since the 2013 federal elections. He has since been serving on the Finance Committee, the Committee on Foreign Affairs and its Subcommittee on the United Nations, International Organizations and Globalization. In addition, he is a member of the parliament’s delegation to the Parliamentary Assembly of the Mediterranean.

As member of the Committee on Foreign Affairs, Radwan serves as his parliamentary group’s rapporteur on relations with the Middle East, the Maghreb and Sudan. On the Finance Committee, he is the group’s rapporteur on the Euro and the banking union.

In the negotiations to form a coalition government under the leadership of Chancellor Angela Merkel following the 2017 federal elections, Radwan was part of the working group on foreign policy, led by Ursula von der Leyen, Gerd Müller and Sigmar Gabriel.

Other activities
After serving as Of counsel with the Munich office of law firm GSK Stockmann + Kollegen until 2015, Radwan and former finance minister Theo Waigel joined Waigel Rechtsanwälte in 2016.

In addition to his legal practice, Radwan holds the following positions:
 Federal Financial Supervisory Authority (BaFin), Member of the Administrative Council (since 2018)
 German-Arab Friendship Association (DAFG), Member of the Board
 Kangaroo Group, Member
 Young Egyptian Economic Leaders (YEEL), Member of the Board of Trustees
 German Red Cross (DRK), Member of the Presidium (until 2014)
 University of Applied Sciences Rosenheim, Member of the Board of Trustees

References

External links
 
 
 

1964 births
Living people
MEPs for Germany 2004–2009
Christian Social Union in Bavaria MEPs
MEPs for Germany 1999–2004
Members of the Bundestag 2017–2021
Members of the Bundestag for Bavaria
Members of the Bundestag 2013–2017
Members of the Bundestag 2021–2025
Politicians from Munich
Members of the Bundestag for the Christian Social Union in Bavaria
German people of Egyptian descent